Gentianella hyssopifolia is a species of plant in the Gentianaceae family. It is endemic to Ecuador.  Its natural habitats are subtropical or tropical high-altitude shrubland and subtropical or tropical high-altitude grassland.

The Latin word hyssopifolia (which also occurs in several other plant names, including that of cuphea hyssopifolia) means "hyssop-leafed".

References

Endemic flora of Ecuador
hyssopifolia
Vulnerable plants
Taxonomy articles created by Polbot